Olufuko (from an Oshiwambo word meaning wedding) is an annual festival held in Outapi, Namibia. It was officially opened 23 August 2012 by Sam Nujoma, former founding President of the Republic of Namibia. Outapi is a town in Omusati Region in Namibia.

Olufuko is a process where girls between the age of 15-20 are prepared for womanhood. This means they are taught how to do traditional chores at home such as pounding omahangu, cooking, cultivating and understanding the roles of men and women in society and recently the impact of HIV/AIDS, STDs and other illnesses in society. After Olufuko brides are expected to go back to school and finish school and not to get married immediately as it used to be done in the olden days. Several speakers at the Olufuko Official Opening Ceremony have used the occasion to urge all girls to go back to school and none of the girls were ever handed over to a man to get married after the initiation ceremony. People under the age of 16 are considered minors under the Namibian Constitution.

Objectives
Among others, objectives of the festival are to:
 Inform, educate and entertain with the view to appreciate and  enhance traditional and cultural identity.
 Create tourism opportunities.
 Enhance the purpose of unity amongst our people.
 Create awareness within the region through cultural, arts and agricultural activities.
 Preserve and promote culture and tradition.
 Strengthen the local and regional economy.

References

External links
 AllAfrica.com, Namibia: Olufuko Festival Attracts Thousands.
 Outapi Town Council, Electronic copy of Olufuko Festival Magazine 2014 and further information

Festivals in Namibia
Cultural festivals in Namibia